Amader Ei Poth Jodi Na Sesh Hoy is an Indian Bengali language Romantic Comedy Drama television series that broadcasting on Indian Bengali General Entertainment Channel Zee Bangla and is also available on the digital platform ZEE5. It premiered on 12 April 2021 and stars Annwesha Hazra and Writwik Mukherjee. The series is produced by Crazy Ideas Media.

Plot
Urmi Rakshit (Sarkar) is the granddaughter of a well known industrialist, Rajat Shubhra Rakshit. After losing her father at a very young age in a car accident which also made her mother sick for a long time, she was brought up by her paternal aunt and uncle (Gayatree Rakshit and Hirak Subhra Rakshit) who pamper her. But unbeknownst to her, their motives are sinister. It is revealed to the viewers that they orchestrated the car accident in which Urmi's father was killed, and their goal is to keep Urmi under their control so they can ultimately take over her share of the family inheritance. Satyaki Sarkar is a taxi driver hailing from a middle-class joint family. He was a good student but had to give up his dreams in order to take care of his family, but he dreams of having his own app-cab company someday. They fall in love for each other. The rest of the story revolves around how they help each other and take a oath to stay beside each other throughout their lives.

Cast

Main
 Annwesha Hazra as Urmi Sarkar (née Rakshit): Late Deepshubhra and Promita's daughter, Satyaki's wife, Hemanta and Shukla's declared daughter.
 Writwik Mukherjee as Satyaki Sarkar aka Tukai: Hemanta and Shukla's son, Urmi's husband, Late Deepshubhra and Promita's son-in-law .

Recurring
 Abanti Dutta as Promita Rakshit: Urmi's mother; Satyaki's mother-in-law; Late Deepshubhra's wife; Rajat's eldest daughter-in-law.
 Sumanta Mukherjee as Rajat Shubhra Rakshit (Dadu): Urmi and Vicky's paternal grandfather; A businessman, founder and CEO of Rakshit Industries; Late Deepshubhra, Heerak Shubhra and Alok Shubhra's father; Promita, Gayatree and Kajol's father-in-law; Rama's friend.
 Rajat Ganguly as Shobhon Rakshit: A famous businessman; Urmi's elder paternal granduncle; Damayantee's husband, Rajat's paternal elder cousin brother.
 Tulika Basu as Damayantee Rakshit: Urmi's elder paternal grandaunt; Rajat's paternal elder cousin sister-in-law; Shobhon's wife.
 Anindya Chakrabarti / Abhrajit Chakraborty as Heerak Shubhra Rakshit: Urmi's middle uncle 'Kaka', Rajat's middle son, Gayatree's husband, Vicky's father, Rini's father-in-law.
 Nabonita Dey as Gayatree Rakshit (née Ramanujan): Urmi's middle aunt 'Mamoni', Heerak's wife, Vicky's mother, Rini's mother-in-law, Rajat's middle daughter-in-law.
 Arindya Banerjee / Biswabasu Biswas as Shubhra Bikash Rakshit aka Vicky: Urmi's elder cousin brother 'Dadabhai', Gayatree and Heerak's only son, Rini's husband, Hemanta and Shukla's declared son.
 Priyam as Alok Shubhra Rakshit: Urmi's younger uncle 'Chhotokaka' aka 'Baghbabaji', Rajat's youngest son, Kajol's husband.
 Debdyuti Ghosh as Kajol Rakshit: Alok's wife, Urmi's younger aunt 'Kakimoni', Rajat's youngest daughter-in-law.                                                                                       
 Alokananda Roy / Kalyani Mondal / Kumkum Bhattacharya as Rama Sarkar: Satyaki's paternal grandmother aka 'Thammi Aunty', Late Ananta's wife, Hemanta and Sushanta's mother.
 Phalguni Chatterjee as Diganta Sarkar: Satyaki's younger paternal granduncle 'Chhordadu', Minu's husband, Jayanta and Bini's father.
 Manasi Sinha as Mrinalini Sarkar aka Minu: Satyaki's younger paternal grandaunt aka 'Chhoto Thammi'; Diganta's wife, Jayanta and Bini's mother.
 Rohit Mukherjee as Hemanta Sarkar aka Hemu: Satyaki's father, Rama's elder son, Shukla's husband; Urmi's declared father.
 Mayna Banerjee as Shukla Sarkar: Satyaki's mother; Rama's elder daughter-in-law,  Hemanta's wife; Urmi's declared mother.
 Pradip Dhar as Sushanta Sarkar aka Bappa: Satyaki's uncle aka 'Mejka', Rama's younger son; Moli's husband; Mumu and Gouri's father; Suman's father-in-law.
 Suchandra Banerjee as Malini Sarkar aka Moli: Satyaki's paternal  aunt aka 'Mejoma'; Bappa's wife; Mumu and Gouri's mother; Rama's younger daughter-in-law; Suman's mother-in-law
 Dwaipayan Das as Jayanta Sarkar aka Chhoton: Satyaki's uncle aka 'Chhotka'; Diganta and Minu's son; Priya's husband; Bini's younger brother.
 Smritika Majumder as Bandana Sarkar aka Bini: Satyaki's aunt, Diganta and Minu's daughter, Sudeep's wife, Mimi's mother.
 Payel Deb as Nandini Chakraborty (née Sarkar) aka Mumu: Satyaki's younger cousin sister, Bappa and Moli's daughter, Gouri's elder sister, Suman's wife.
 Mishmee Das as Rinita Rakshit aka Rini/Rita (née Biswas) - Satyaki's one-sided lover, neighbour and Satyaki's tuition student, Mimi's bestfriend, Vicky's wife  
 Arpan Paul as Rohit Sarkar aka Gouri: Satyaki's younger cousin brother, Bappa and Moli's son, Mumu's younger brother.
 Tanushree Saha / Liza Sarkar as Riya Sarkar aka Mimi: Satyaki's youngest cousin sister, Bini and Sudeep's daughter.
 Rahul Banerjee as Nantu: The worker of the garage from where Satyaki bought his taxi "Bahandeb". He's like a family member of Sarkar Paribar and a younger brother to Urmi.
 Kunal Banerjee as Piklu Biswas: Rini's cousin brother, Mimi's lover.
 Arkajyoti Paul Chaudhury as Suman Chakraborty: Mumu's husband, Satyaki's younger cousin brother-in-law, Bappa and Moli's son-in-law, Gouri's elder brother-in-law.
 Shuvanan Dutta as Abhik: Suman's friend 
 Ritoja Majumder as Sonali Biswas aka Sona: Shukla's elder sister, Satyaki's maternal aunt 'Sona Mashi'.
 Poonam Basak as Jini: Urmi's friend turned foe cum competitor.
 Chaitali Das as Babli: Urmi's close friend she also turned foe cum competitor.
 Sanghasri Sinha Mitra as Shakuntala Roy: Mumu's Would-be mother in law, But they faced a situation and they rejected Mumu.
 Arijita Mukhopadhyay as Miss Dutta aka  Miss Bhayangkori: The admin head of a school where Satyaki works as a taxi driver.
 Ananda Chowdhury as Sagnik Bose: Kajol's childhood and school friend.
 Anindya Banerjee as Mr.Basu: lawyer who fights case against Satyaki.
 Swarnendu Samaddar as Raja Dutta: a director.
 Lama Halder as Sadananda Mitra: a former criminal minister, Urmi's declared brother.
 Subrata Guha Roy as Ananda Chakroborty: Suman's father.
 Aparajita Ghosh as Chanda Chakroborty: Suman's mother.
 Rhain Ghosh as Parna: Suman's sister.
 Ankita Biswas as Mohona Sengupta aka Meghbalika Mohona.
 Monika Dey as Tojo's mother.
 Riju Biswas as Mr. Pawan Bhatiya.
 Judhajit Banerjee as Sudip: Satyaki's uncle, Diganta and Minu's son-in-law, Bini's husband, Mimi's father.
 Nabomita Chatterjee as Priya Sarkar (née Sharma): Satyaki's aunt aka 'Chhotki'; Diganta and Minu's daughter-in-law; Jayanta's wife; Bini's younger sister-in-law.

References

External links
  Ei Poth Jodi Na Sesh Hoy at ZEE5

Bengali-language television programming in India
2021 Indian television series debuts
Zee Bangla original programming
2022 Indian television series endings